A breakthrough role, also known as a breakout role, is a term in the film industry to describe the performance of an actor or actress which contributed significantly to the development of their career and beginning of critical recognition. A breakthrough role is often a significant increase in importance in the actor's part in the film, such as moving up from a minor character to one of the main cast or a "high impact" role in a film which has mainstream success and results in the actor's widespread recognition and popularity. A breakthrough performance has also been defined as one which "attracts the attention of film critics, or receives rave reviews and is subsequently nominated for many major film awards".

Lord Rohan in The Man in Grey has been cited as James Mason's breakthrough performance. The television film adaptation of Gideon's Trumpet has been referenced as Lane Smith's breakthrough role, despite lacking a theatrical release. Similarly, the BBC series Pennies from Heaven has been highlighted as the breakthrough of Bob Hoskins. Brandon Lee's starring role in The Crow has been cited as his breakout, though it was also his final film as he died when a prop gun malfunctioned on the set of the film.

References

External links
6 Actors Defined By Their Breakout Roles at Maxim.
Stars' surprising breakout movie roles at Teen Vogue

Film and video terminology